Sarah Utterback is an American actress, most notable for her role as Nurse Olivia Harper on ABC's medical drama series Grey's Anatomy.  She is also a film and theater producer.

Life
Utterback attended New Hampton High School in New Hampton, Iowa. She studied drama at the Royal Academy of Dramatic Art in London and the School at Steppenwolf in Chicago. She is the founder of Rushforth Productions and the IAMA Theatre Company in Los Angeles, California.

Career
Her theater credits include the U.S. premiere of Ladybird by Russian playwright Vassily Sigarev, and the world premiere stage adaptation of Federico Fellini's Il bidone. She originated the title role in Surfer Girl, a one-woman play in the Seven Deadly Plays series by playwright and screenwriter Leslye Headland.

Film and television credits include My First Time Driving (2007), Ghost Whisperer, Cold Case, Family Guy, Medium, and Grey's Anatomy. She produced the short film Who You Know (2007).

Filmography

References

External links

Living people
American film actresses
American television actresses
Actresses from Iowa
People from New Hampton, Iowa
Alumni of RADA
21st-century American actresses
Year of birth missing (living people)